Homeobox protein Hox-C10 is a protein that in humans is encoded by the HOXC10 gene.

Function 

This gene belongs to the homeobox family of genes. The homeobox genes encode a highly conserved family of transcription factors that play an important role in morphogenesis in all multicellular organisms. Mammals possess four similar homeobox gene clusters, HOXA, HOXB, HOXC and HOXD, which are located on different chromosomes and consist of 9 to 11 genes arranged in tandem. This gene is one of several homeobox HOXC genes located in a cluster on chromosome 12. The protein level is controlled during cell differentiation and proliferation, which may indicate this protein has a role in origin activation.

Pathology 

 HOXC10 is overexpressed in breast cancer and transcriptionally regulated by estrogen via involvement of histone methylases MLL3 and MLL4. 
 Methylation of the estrogen-repressed gene HOXC10 in breast cancer determines resistance to aromatase inhibitors. This epigenetic reprogramming of HOXC10 is observed in endocrine-resistant breast cancer.

References

Further reading

External links 
 

Transcription factors